Betsey Brown is an African-American literature novel by Ntozake Shange, published in 1985.

Plot
Betsey Brown is the story of an adolescent African-American girl growing up in 1959 St. Louis, Missouri, who is part of the first generation of students to be integrated in the public school system.  She navigates common adolescent issues such as family dynamics, first love, and identity questions.

Major themes
Thematic concerns of the novel include African-American family life, coming of age, feminism, and racial freedom.  One critic described the narrative structure of the novel as paralleling "the personal story of Betsey’s attaining self-confidence with the social achievements of the Civil Rights Movement."  This structure allows Shange to address feminist issues in addition to racial issues.

Development history
In order to write the novel, Shange drew on her own experiences growing up in St. Louis, but the resulting novel is not entirely autobiographical. Nevertheless, like Betsey Brown, Shange really did know such African-American celebrities as Chuck Berry and W. E. B. Du Bois.

Publication history
Betsey Brown was published in 1985 by St. Martin's Press.

Explanation of the novel's title
Set in the aftermath of Brown v. Board of Education —the landmark case in which the US Supreme Court ruled that laws establishing separate public schools for black and white students were unconstitutional—the novel is eponymous.

Literary significance and reception
Though perhaps the least known of Shange's work, the novel has been called "a little gem."

Adaptations
Shange adapted the novel into a musical play, which has been performed in various cities.

References

External links
 Video of Ntozake Shange discussing growing up in St. Louis.
Ntozake Shange Papers, 1966-2016; Barnard Archives and Special Collections, Barnard Library, Barnard College.

African-American novels
1985 American novels
Fiction set in 1959
Novels set in St. Louis
Literature by African-American women
Novels by Ntozake Shange
American young adult novels
American novels adapted into plays